Guller or Güller is a surname. Notable people with the surname include:

Serhat Güller (born 1968), Turkish footballer and manager
Urs Güller (born 1967), Swiss cyclist
Youra Guller (1895–1980), French classical pianist

See also
Fuller (surname)